French Fields is a British television sitcom. It is a sequel/continuation of the series Fresh Fields and ran for 19 episodes from 5 September 1989 to 8 October 1991. It was written by John T. Chapman (who created and wrote all the episodes of Fresh Fields) and Ian Davidson and was produced by Thames Television for ITV.

Cast
The series stars Anton Rodgers and Julia McKenzie as middle-aged, middle-class husband and wife William and Hester Fields and follows the series Fresh Fields, which ran from 1984 to 1986. French Fields resumes the story three years later as William accepts a position with a French company and the series follows Hester and William as they move from London to Calais. The pair are regularly visited by their daughter Emma (Sally Baxter and Karen Ascoe) and son-in-law Peter (Philip Bird). Bird is the only other Fresh Fields actor to appear regularly, as Emma only "appeared" via voiceover by Debby Cummings in the original show.

Other regular cast members include their French estate agent Chantal Moriac (Pamela Salem), who is also the Fields' neighbour to the left, and snobbish English couple Hugh (Robin Kermode) and Jill (Liz Crowther) Trendle, the neighbours to the right. Hester and William also cope with Madame Remoleux (Valerie Lush), the unintelligible, ancient, and generally useless (but unsackable) French cleaner who lives on and cares for the estate, "Les Hirondelles," ("Swallows" in English) where they all live. Also popping in regularly are local farmer and mayor Monsieur Dax (Olivier Pierre in series 1 and 2 and Philip McGough in series 3) and his cheeky daughter Marie-Christine (Victoria Baker), to whom Hester does her best to teach English. Nicholas Courtney also appears frequently as the estate's owner, the Marquis.

Ann Beach, Sonia in Fresh Fields, makes a guest appearance in the final episode, in which Hester and William decide to return to their former UK home.

Episodes

Series 1 (1989)

Series 2 (1990)

Christmas special (1990)

Series 3 (1991)

Home releases
All three series of French Fields have been released on DVD by Network. A 7-disc boxed set containing all episodes of both Fresh Fields and French Fields was also released by the company.

The entire series was released in a single DVD box set by Acorn Media UK on 2012-2-28.

References

External links

1989 British television series debuts
1991 British television series endings
1980s British sitcoms
1990s British sitcoms
English-language television shows
ITV sitcoms
Television shows produced by Thames Television
Television series about marriage
Television series by Fremantle (company)
Television shows set in France
Television shows shot at Teddington Studios